Luis Javier Méndez Moza (born 12 July 1985) is a Bolivian footballer who currently plays for the Liga de Futbol Profesional Boliviano side Jorge Wilstermann as a centre back.

International career
He represented his country in 4 FIFA World Cup qualification matches.

References

External links

Cero a Cero profile

1985 births
Living people
Sportspeople from Santa Cruz de la Sierra
Association football central defenders
Bolivian footballers
Bolivia international footballers
Oriente Petrolero players
The Strongest players
Club San José players
C.D. Jorge Wilstermann players